Adam Gary Devine (born 23 March 2003) is a Scottish footballer who plays for Scottish club Rangers. He is the grandson of Sydney Devine.

Career
Devine, a product of the Rangers Academy, signed a contract extension with Rangers until 2022 on 29 September 2020. On 6 March 2021, Devine joined then Scottish Championship side Partick Thistle on loan for the rest of the season. The move was cut short after two weeks and Devine joined then League Two side Brechin City on 23 March. He made eleven league appearances for City, his first being a start in a 2-0 defeat away to Stranraer on 23 March 2021.

On 8 June 2021, Devine was one of five youth players who signed new contracts at Rangers, with the former agreeing a deal to the summer of 2023. Devine made his debut for Rangers by replacing James Tavernier as a 66th minute substitute during a 2–0 win over Dundee United on 8 May 2022.

International career
He has represented Scotland at various levels and has played twice for the under-21s team.

Career statistics

References

External links

2003 births
Living people
Scottish footballers
Association football defenders
Rangers F.C. players
Partick Thistle F.C. players
Brechin City F.C. players
Scottish Professional Football League players
Lowland Football League players
Scotland under-21 international footballers
Scotland youth international footballers